The IHF Women's Handball World Championship has been organized by the International Handball Federation since 1957. European teams have won every time except 1995 where South Korea won as the first team outside Europe and 2013 where Brazil won as the first American team. The biggest winners are Russia and Norway with four titles each.

Nine teams participated in the first championship, this number has grown in steps to 32 (from 2021). In 1977 a B-tournament was introduced and later in 1986 a C-tournament which served as qualification for the real championship or A-tournament. The B- and C-tournament qualifications were replaced by the present qualification system based on continental confederations in 1993.

From 1993 it has been held every other year. Between 1978 and 1990 it was held every fourth alternating with the Olympic tournament (introduced for women handball in 1976). The first five tournaments were held in the summer or early fall whereas the rest has been held in November or December.

Tournaments

Medal table
IHF only includes medals won at the indoor championships.

Participation nations

Source: IHF official site.

Since first entering the tournament in 1957, Romania are the only team to have appeared in all 25 tournaments to date.

Most successful players
Boldface denotes active handball players and highest medal count among all players (including these who not included in these tables) per type.

Multiple gold medalists
The table shows players who have won at least 3 gold medals at the World Championships.

** including two medals won at the 1956 and 1960 World Outdoor Field Handball Championships

Multiple medalists
The table shows players who have won at least 4 medals in total at the World Championships.

Top scorers and best platers by tournament
The record-holder for scored goals in a single World Championship is Bojana Radulović. She scored 97 goals for Hungary at the 2003 World Championship.

Largest winning margin

Source: TV2Sporten.no

See also
World Men's Handball Championship

References

External links
Women's WC at IHF

 
IHF World Women's Handball Championship
IHF World Women's Handball Championship
Women's
November sporting events
December sporting events
World